The 2020 Karachi floods  were the worst flooding Karachi had seen in almost a century, and killed at least 41 people across Pakistan. The floods were caused by record monsoon rains, which were inadequately drained by poorly maintained drainage systems in the city. The resulting floods caused deaths and destruction of infrastructure and properties in the city.

Background and Details of the 2020 Karachi Floods

Flood Events in Pakistan 
Flooding is Pakistan's most threatening natural disaster. There have been eight floods in Pakistan in the last two decades.

Common Causes of Flooding in Pakistan 
The frequency of floods has been increasing over time. The causes of floods can be divided into factors affecting rainfall, and factors affecting water retention, such as drainage and deforestation. Climate change is the primary cause of the increasing trend in flooding frequency and severity in Pakistan.

2020 Karachi Floods 
It has been the worst flooding since 1931 in Karachi, killing at least 41 people and leaving hundreds of thousands trapped. The record monsoon rains with inadequate drainage systems in the city caused this flood. The heavy rainfalls shattered all-time records for rainfall in a single day and other records. During August 2020, 484 mm of rain fell and was the highest amount of rain in August back to 1931. The rainfall for a single day set a new record of 223.5 mm, surpassing the previous high of 211.3 mm set in 1967.

Landslides, infrastructure damage, and traffic jams caused by the floods disrupted the daily lives of around 15 million residents.

Urban Conditions in the Flood 
Flooding engulfed the city, Karachi, bringing everything to a halt. There was a devastating damage to public infrastructures (such as broken electricity cables) and private properties (such as buildings collapsed). These damages also brought about a series of subsequent crises, with eight people dying in Karachi as a result of a wall collapse.

Causes of the Floods

Deterioration of Drainage Channels 

The damage of drains in Karachi, called nalas (such as Gujjar Nala) has been severe in recent years. Residents buy solid waste and compact it along nalas to protect their homes and this move reduces the width of the nala.  In addition, since the only two landfills in Karachi are far from the eastern city, lots of non-recyclable materials are thrown in to nalas. As the development plan of Karachi was not implemented, the pressure of insufficient space for commercial activities forced the government to build bazaars over the nalas.

Vast Population Increase and Lack of Development in Sewers 
As the population of Karachi increases and the city expands, the construction of various sectors is becoming far away from the gutter garden, which is one part of Karachi's sewage system. A planned sewage treatment plant was never built.

Real Estate Development 
Due to the large-scale real estate development, many natural drainage channels and water collection depressions have been dismantled in the hilly formations north of the city. When it rains, the south of the area is completely flooded.

Serious Institutional Issues 
The central and provincial governments of Karachi are controlled by different political parties and their views cannot be unified, making it is struggled to solve the infrastructure problems of Karachi and even unable to get sufficient investment to deal with drainage trouble.

Types of Response

Local strategies

Local Government 

In response to the catastrophic floods in Karachi, Sindh Chief Minister Murad Ali Shah ordered that schools be used as resettlement sites for these displaced families.

Meeran Yousuf, a spokesperson for the Sindh Health Government, said the health department was spraying disinfectants to eliminate larvae to avert dengue and malaria epidemics after the massive floods.

Pakistani Army & Other National Authority 
The Pakistani army was also summoned to Karachi on July 30, 2020, to aid the civil authorities in addressing the city's flooding problem. Meanwhile, the Pakistan Army also collaborated with the local National Disaster Management Authority (NDMA) and Frontier Works Organization (FWO)to relief Karachi residents who have been affected by the monsoon rains. Additionally, they would be entrusted with cleaning up the debris left by the city's floods.

The Emergency Response Force (ERF) has been sent to help persons in need in many sites around Karachi on 20 August 2020.

Internationals assistance

Baitulmaal Response 

Local rescuers assisted by Baitulmaal (a Dallas-based international humanitarian organization) helped evacuate surviving residents of Karachi's Gulberg Town. The team provided them with hot meals, water, hygiene supplies, and food parcels and provided drinking water to other flood-affected areas of Karachi, such as Yousuf Goth and Abdullah Town. Employees of Baitulmaal delivered supplies via truck to individuals who were unable to escape in time.

WFP Response 
The World Food Programme(WFP) also responded to the unprecedented floods by supplying 95 MT of food aid to 1,780 affected households in Karachi on 22 September 2020.

Other International Organization 
During the Karachi floods, the Pakistan Red Crescent Society (PRCS) worked closely with International organization such as the International Committee of Red Cross (ICRC), the German Red Cross (GRC), the Norwegian Red Cross (NorCross), and the Turkish Red Crescent Society (TRCS) to give a timely response to Karachi's impacted citizens.

Impact of the Floods

Geographical Impact   
Monsoon rains caused damage and severe flooding in 20 areas of Sindh province. Flash floods forced dozens of villagers to evacuate to higher ground. After the rainstorm in Johi, flash floods in Kirthar Mountains flooded hundreds of villages along the coast of Katcha. 109 villages in Dadu District were trapped. More than 80% of crops in Mirpur Khas and Tharparkar were destroyed by rainstorms. The flood burst the FP protection dam of Nai Gaj Dam, Johi, Dadu by 26 feet, and flooded other riverside villages in Sindh province. The flood affecting more than 2 million people and displacing 68000 residents in relief camps.

Physical Impact 
The floods have also caused enormous physical damage to the area. Heavy rainfall caused flooding in Karachi, inundation of streets, houses and outdated urban drainage systems, and collapse of lines, resulting in large-scale power failure in the city. 23 houses were partially damaged and 1 house was completely damaged. The Pakistan government also reported that nearly 1 million acres of crops were destroyed by the floods. The fields of cotton, vegetables, onions, tomatoes, and sugarcane were affected. In addition, the rainstorm destroyed the main infrastructure of the city and made the highway network impassable. The entire residential area and market were flooded, causing losses worth millions of rupees to houses and enterprises.

Immediate Mortality and Morbidity Implications 
The floods in Karachi pose a threat to people's lives, not only causing casualties, but also contributing to the spread of disease. The flood caused at least 34 people were killed, nine were injured. Meanwhile, it increased the risk of  Dengue fever outbreak due to poor flood control and water treatment facilities, and many cases have been reported after the flood outbreak. COVID-19 pandemic is also being controlled by health authorities as the monsoon storm rages. Dengue fever and COVID-19 pandemic occurs simultaneously may have a serious impact on the society and economy, especially Pakistan, a low-and middle-income country.

Health Consequences

Short-term Consequences 
In 2020, the province of Sindh had reported 733 cases of dengue in the first 8 months, with about 92% of the cases being reported in Karachi. At least 10 more dengue cases had been reported in the city during flood. COVID-related disruptions severely impeding diagnosis and treatment of the diseases, access to relief from floods as well as affordability of mosquito nets. These infectious diseases could be devastating for an already weakened health care system in Pakistan.

Studies have shown that the amount of rainfall is the single most crucial factor for dengue virus transmission. Water retained on rooftops and containers after heavy rain episodes become the ideal breeding spots for Aedes mosquitoes, which unfortunately, was also the source of drinking water for refugees due to the turning off of underground water tank.

Different water and vector borne diseases had already emerged after heavy flooding, such as dengue, malaria, diarrhea, typhoid and hepatitis. Without urgent large scale disinfection programs, a sharp spike in disease could be seen in few months.

Long-term Consequences 
Mortality rates were found to increase by up to 50% in the first year post-flood.  Evidence shows that there are seven diseases will increase significantly in the wake of flood: diarrhea, skin, eye infections, leptospirosis, malaria, leishmaniasis, respiratory infections and hepatitis, particularly in areas with poor hygiene and displaced populations. Psychological distress in survivors (prevalence 8.6% to 53% two years post-flood) can also exacerbate their physical illness. There is a need for effective policies to reduce and prevent flood-related morbidity and mortality, contingent upon the improved understanding of potential health impacts of floods. Global trends in urbanization, burden of disease, malnutrition and maternal and child health must be better reflected in flood preparedness and mitigation programs.

See also
 Climate of Karachi
 2009 Karachi floods
 2017 Karachi floods

References 

2020 disasters in Pakistan
2020 in Sindh
2020 floods
August 2020 events in Pakistan
Disasters in Sindh
Floods in Pakistan